The Horsehay Sand Formation is a geological formation in England. Part of the Great Oolite Group, it was deposited in the Bajocian to Bathonian stages of the Middle Jurassic, the lithology consists of weakly cemented sand and sandstone, with thin interbeds of mudstone and siltstone. Rootlets and lignitic debris are common. It is the lateral equivalent of the Chipping Norton Limestone and the lower part of the Rutland Formation

References

Jurassic England
Rock formations of England
Geologic formations of the United Kingdom
Jurassic System of Europe
Bathonian Stage